Varsity Derby League (formerly known as ANU Roller Derby)  is a roller derby league based in the Australian Capital Territory. VDL is Canberra's only gender inclusive league, allowing both men and women to participate in the sport of roller derby.

History
In 2011, Canberran student roller derby enthusiasts worked on starting a new league, ANU Roller Derby League, as a student organisation at Australian National University. In mid-2011 the league officially changed its name to 'Varsity Derby League' (VDL).  In August 2011, VDL incorporated as an independent Association.

VDL currently has two representative women's teams, the DisHonour Rollers (DHRs) and the Rogue Scholars.

In May 2013, VDL became the first Canberran roller derby league to train skaters of any gender as players. In 2014, VDL established Canberra's first (and only) men's team, Capital Carnage. With the inclusion of men in the league, VDL has also formed a mixed-gender team, The Smackademics, to compete against other mixed teams in tournaments and friendly games.

In 2016, the DisHonour Rollers took top honours in the A-Division of the Eastern Region Roller Derby championships, while the Rogue Scholars brought home the trophy for the B-Division, thus marking the first time in the event's history for teams of the same league to take home the trophy in both Divisions.

In April 2017, VDL became a Mens Roller Derby Association (MRDA)-affiliated league and Capital Carnage competed in their first ever MRDA tournament, MRDA Down Under. Capital Carnage is keenly awaiting the quarterly MRDA ranking list to be released, where they anticipate being ranked somewhere around 45th in the world.

Teams
Varsity Derby League currently fields a total of four teams.

VDL's women's A representative team is the DisHonour Rollers and were the league's first representative team forming in 2011.

VDL now has a second women's B team, The Rogue Scholars, formed in 2015.

The men's team, Capital Carnage, formed in 2014.

Varsity also has a mixed gender team, featuring players of all genders represented in the league, called the Smackademics, formed in 2015.

VDL previously had two (women's) home teams, The PhDemons, whose colours were purple and black, and the Cheerbleeders, who skated in red and gold. In 2013 the decision was made by the league to focus on the representative team and playing inter-league bouts.

Logos and Uniforms

All four Varsity Derby League teams have their own coloured uniform with the DisHonour Rollers skating in grey, The Rogue Scholars in green, Capital Carnage in pink and The Smackademics in purple. All four teams have a red uniform as their alternate strip.

Skaters

Officials

The league's referees, also known as "team zebra", is made up of a mixture of full-time referees and drafted skaters who also referee. Denominator is the League's current Head Referee.

The League's non-skating officials (NSOs) are volunteer officials involved in all officiating roles not assigned as on-skates positions. This includes penalty-timing, lineup-tracking and score-keeping. Leo Slayer is the League's current Head NSO.

See also

 List of roller derby leagues

References

Sports competitions in Canberra
Roller derby leagues in Australia
Roller derby leagues established in 2011
2011 establishments in Australia